Elvenking is a heavy metal band from Sacile, Italy. As of 2019, they have released one demo and ten full-length studio albums. Elvenking's music draws inspiration from different genres such as metal, folk, hard rock, pop, prog, and classical music.

Biography

The origins (1997–2000) 
Elvenking was formed in late October 1997 by two guitarist friends, Aydan and Jarpen, both sharing a passion for heavy metal music and folklore. They were soon joined by Sargon as bassist. The young band faced many issues with its line-up that prevented them from progressing. In March 1998, Damnagoras joined the band as a lead singer, and was followed by the arrival of the drummer Zender in September. It was only then that the band found stability.

The members of Elvenking intended to create a fusion of power metal and folk music. After gaining experience through many shows, the band decided to record a promotional album, To Oak Woods Bestowed, in 2000. Damnagoras performed both lead vocals and bass for the recording and subsequent concerts as Sargon previously left the band. The demo was successful enough to allow Elvenking to sign a contract with German label AFM Records.

Soon after, Gorlan, a friend of Aydan and Jarpen, fully joined as a bassist. He had appeared before as a session player.

First six albums (2001–2010) 
The first full-length album Heathenreel was recorded at New Sin Audio Design by Luigi Stefanini and mixed at Fredman Studios by Fredrik Nordstrom. The cover artwork was created by Travis Smith and the band logo was designed by J.P. Fournier, who also designed covers for Avantasia and Immortal. The album was released on July 23, 2001 and received praise from metal critics around the world. Elvenking then toured around Europe at festivals with popular power metal acts including Blind Guardian, Gamma Ray, Edguy and Virgin Steele.

In August 2002 singer Damnagoras took leave from the band due to health concerns. Elvenking then recruited a new vocalist, Kleid, who revitalized the spirit of folk music within the band. Elyghen, a violinist and keyboard player, joined soon after. The shift in the line-up led to their second album, Wyrd, recorded at Gernhart studios in Siegburg with Martin Buchwalter, and mixed & mastered at House of music studios with Achim Kolher and released on April 19, 2004.

In late 2004 Damnagoras returned, taking the place of Kleid, and Elvenking began working on their third album, The Winter Wake.

On February 4, 2005, founding guitarist Jarpen left Elvenking. Aydan commented:
"Jarpen didn't feel comfortable playing Elvenking's music anymore having lost passion in this kind of stuff. It was a long time he was talking with us about and when Damna was back in, knowing the direction we wanted to go, he told us his willing to leave. We have tried to convince him to give it a try, but it did not work out.
It's a really sad thing because Jarpen was one of the founding members and we have created all this from the beginning together, but on the other hand being friends before musicians we know that this is what Jarpen wanted and we totally respect his decision.
We will miss you, friend!"

The Winter Wake was released and premiered live on March 11, 2006 in Pordenone, Italy.

On November 3, 2006, a new album was announced to be in the works according to the official website; The Scythe was released on September 14, 2007.

On April 14, 2008, the band announced that they were beginning work on the next album and that it would be a "totally acoustic album". In a later post the band explained that while they viewed this new album as a chance to explore their folk influences it would also be a chance for them to experiment in new areas as well. It was also added that they already had some material written for a "heavy" album; however, this album would wait until after the acoustic album was released.

On January 14, 2009, the band announced the addition of a new guitarist, Raffaello "Rafahel" Indri. Rafahel had played live with the band for two years before being added as a permanent member.

On September 29, 2009 the band. announced Lethien to be their new live violin player. Lethien would also take Elyghen's place in the rehearsal room until the latter's return to Italy.

On February 9, 2010 it was announced that Dennis Ward would be producing Elvenking's new album, with Mat Sinner taking the role of executive producer. The recordings started on March 20. The album, called Red Silent Tides, was released on September 17 in Europe, and November 9 in North America.

After the release of Red Silent Tides, the band started a full European tour to support the album. Part of this tour was spent supporting German power metal band Primal Fear.

Era and The Pagan Manifesto (2011–Present) 
In early 2011, drummer Zender left the band and was replaced by Symohn. Recording for a new album began early the next year. Era was released in September 2012 and saw the band return more to their pagan roots with more prevalent folk elements meshing with their traditional heavy metal sound.

Elvenking released their 8th studio album titled the Pagan Manifesto on May 9, 2014 in the U.K. and on May 27, 2014 in the U.S., with the same line-up intact from their previous effort. The first single, Elvenlegions, was released on Soundcloud and is a dedication to the fans. An accompanying music video for the song was released in late April. The album marks a return to the folk/power metal sound of the band's first two albums. The song "King of the Elves" contains a medley of "White Willow", a song from their first album, Heathenreel, as well as revisiting some familiar lyrical lines of the song. The track is roughly 13 minutes long, the longest in the Elvenking catalog.

In September 2014, Elvenking's Website launched a fan poll asking fans to vote for songs for the band to perform live during the next leg of the band's "Pagan Manifestour". The top three most voted songs by the fans were "Chronicle of a Frozen Era", "Poison Tears", and "White Willow".

The official lyric video for "Draugen's Maelstrom" on their upcoming album was released on October 5, 2017. On November 10, 2017, Elvenking released their 9th studio album titled Secrets of the Magick Grimoire with Symohn being replaced by Lancs on drums.

On 30 August 2019, the band published their tenth studio album titled "Reader of the Runes – Divination". The concept album features eight different characters whose destiny is shaped by the Reader of the Runes.

Influences 
Elvenking has declared itself to be a band highly influenced by folk music and dances from all over the world, but especially from all the metal scene and from "any other cool stuff may it be pop, punk or whatever". Amongst the most influential bands on Elvenking's style is Skyclad.

Damna, the lead singer, lists his favorite bands and musicians as "Everything that’s cool to my ears from metal to pop music. Some of my favourite artists are Kiss, Iron Maiden, Guns N’ Roses, Queen, Mötley Crüe, Marilyn Manson, Aerosmith, In Flames, Hardcore Superstar, Dimmu Borgir, Rob Zombie, Michael Jackson, Dissection, Iced Earth, Pantera, Wednesday 13, Bon Jovi, Slipknot, Nickelback, Stone Sour, Lady Gaga, Sixx AM, Cannibal Corpse, Papa Roach, Buckcherry, Madonna, Cradle of Filth, King Diamond, Mercyful Fate, Skid Row, etc."

Aydan, lists his favorite bands and musicians as "Helloween, Skyclad, Children of Bodom, Nightwish, Iron Maiden, Mercyful Fate, King Diamond, Dark Tranquillity, Cradle of Filth, Candlemass, My Dying Bride, Trans-Siberian Orchestra, Simple Plan, Queen, Angels & Airwaves, etc."

Lineup

Current members 
 Davide "Damnagoras" Moras – vocals (1998–2002, 2004–present)
 Federico "Aydan" Baston – guitars (1997–present)
 Fabio "Lethien" Polo – violin (2009–present)
 Simone "Symohn" Morettin – drums (2011–2017, live 2019-2022, 2022-present)
 Alessandro "Jakob" Jacobi – bass (2012–present)
 Mattia "Headmatt" Carli – guitars (live 2019–2022, 2022-present)

Former members 
 Massimo "Kleid" Bottiglieri – vocals (2002–2004)
 Jarpen – guitars, unclean vocals (2002–2004)
 Sargon – bass (1997–2000)
Gorlan – bass (2000–2011)
 Zender – drums (1998–2011)
Elyghen – violin (2002–2009)
Raffaello "Rafahel" Indri – guitars (2007–2022)

Timeline

Discography

Studio albums 
 Heathenreel (2001)
 Wyrd (2004)
 The Winter Wake (2006)
 The Scythe (2007)
 Two Tragedy Poets (...And a Caravan of Weird Figures) (2008)
 Red Silent Tides (2010)
 Era (2012)
 Pagan Manifesto (2014)
 Secrets of the Magick Grimoire (2017)
 Reader of the Runes – Divination (2019)

Singles/music videos
 The Divided Heart – 2007
 The Cabal – 2010
 Your Heroes Are Dead – 2011
 Poor Little Baroness (Lyric Video) – 2012
 The Loser – 2012
 Elvenlegions – 2014
 The Solitare (Lyric Video) – 2015
 Draugen's Maelstrom (Lyric Video) – 2017
 Invoking the Woodland Spirit – 2017
 The One We Shall Follow – 2018
 Under the Sign of a Black Star – 2019
 Silverseal – 2019
 Divination – 2019
 Rapture - 2022
 The Hanging Tree - 2023
 Bride of Night'' - 2023

References

External links 
 
 Elvenking on Myspace
 Elvenking on Encyclopaedia Metallum
 Elvenking at Metal Storm

Musical groups established in 1997
Italian power metal musical groups
Italian folk metal musical groups